Phyllonorycter bicinctella is a moth of the family Gracillariidae. It is known from Hokkaido island of Japan and the Russian Far East.

The larvae feed on Ulmus davidiana var. japonica, Quercus crispula and Ulmus pumila. They mine the leaves of their host plant. The mine is ptychonomous and located on the space between two veins of the lower surface of the leaves.

References

bicinctella
Moths of Asia
Moths described in 1931